Kyzylsky District (Kızıl kojuun) is an administrative and municipal district (raion, or kozhuun), one of the seventeen in the Tuva Republic, Russia. It is located in the center of the republic. Its administrative center is the urban locality (an urban-type settlement) of Kaa-Khem. Population:  22,678 (2002 Census);  The population of Kaa-Khem accounts for 54.4% of the district's total population.

References

Notes

Sources

Districts of Tuva